AK4, AK 4 or AK-4 may refer to:

 Richardson Highway, Alaska Route 4
 , a US navy ship
 Ak 4 rifle, the Swedish version of the Heckler & Koch G3 battle rifle, known as AK4 
AK4 (gene)